Inkjet solar cells are solar cells manufactured by low-cost, high tech methods that use an inkjet printer to lay down the semiconductor material and the electrodes onto a  solar cell substrate.

This approach is being developed independently at various locations including the University of New South Wales, Oregon State University, Massachusetts Institute of Technology, and Saule Technologies Since the appearance of perovskite solar cells, and their rapid growth in research cell efficiency  there is a renewed interest in the development of inkjet printed solar cells, due to their nature of being solution processable.

History 
The first case of printed electronics was seen in 1903 when Albert Hanson filed a patent for "printed" wire. After that the radio drove the industry of printed electronics forward. Until recently inkjet printers have not been used in the printed electronics industry. Industry has decided to move towards inkjet printing because of its low cost and flexibility of use. One of these used is the inkjet solar cell. The first instance of constructing a solar cell with an inkjet printer was by Konarka in 2008. In 2011 Oregon State University was able to discover a way to create CIGS solar cells using an inkjet printer. In the same year MIT was able to create a solar cell using an inkjet printer on paper. The use of an inkjet printer to make solar cells is very new and is still being researched. In 2014, Olga Malinkiewicz presented her inkjet printing manufacturing process for perovskite sheets in Boston (USA) during the MRS fall meeting - for which she received MIT Technology review's innovators under 35 award.

How they are made 
In general inkjet solar cells are made by using an inkjet printer to put down the semiconductor material and electrodes onto a solar cell substrate. Both organic and inorganic solar cells can be made using the inkjet method. Inkjet printed inorganic solar cells are mainly CIGS solar cells. The organic solar cells are polymer solar cells. The inkjet printing of hybrid perovskite solar cells is also possible. The most important component of the ink is the functional material: a metal salt mixture (CIGS), a polymer fullerene blend (polymer solar cells) or a precursor of mixed organic and inorganic salts (perovskite solar cells). These components are dissolved in an appropriate solvent. Additional components might be added to affect the viscosity and the surface tension of the ink for improved printability and wetting on the substrate. The ink is contained in a cartridge from where it is transferred onto a substrate which can vary. The printing is accomplished usually by a piezoelectric driver in the nozzles of the printhead, that is programmed to apply pre-set patterns of pressure to eject droplets. In most cases several layers of functional materials are deposited on top of each other to generate a working solar cell. The entire printing process can be done in ambient conditions, though in most cases further heat treatments are needed. Important factors for the efficiency of inkjet printed organic solar cells are the inkjet latency time, the inkjet printing table temperature, and the effect of the chemical properties of the polymer donor.

Advantages 
The main advantage to printing solar cells with an inkjet printer is the low cost of production. The reason it is cheaper than other methods is because no vacuum is necessary which makes the equipment cheaper. Also, the ink is a low cost metal salt blend reducing the cost of the solar cells. There is very little waste of material in comparison to other methods like vapor phase deposition when using inkjet printers to lay down the semiconductor material. This is because the printer is able to create precise patterning with little waste. Some inkjet solar cells use the material CIGS which has more solar efficiency than the traditional silicon solar panels. Using CIGS makes it very important to have little waste due to how rare some of the materials in it are. This method is also environmentally friendly because it does not require the use of toxic chemicals to prepare the solar cell like other methods do.

Disadvantages 
The efficiency of inkjet solar cells are too low to be commercially viable. Even if the efficiency gets better the materials used for the solar cells could be a problem.   Indium is a rare material used in these cells and could be gone within 15 years according to our current usage. Another issue is creating a weather resistant ink that can survive harsh conditions.

Potential 
In traditional solar cells the material that holds the photovoltaic material generally costs more than the material itself. With inkjet printing it is possible to print solar cells on paper. This will allow solar cells to be much cheaper and be placed almost anywhere. Paper thin solar cells or eventually direct 3D printing will allow to create solar cells on blinds, in windows, in curtains, and almost anywhere in the home. This is very promising and could be the future of solar power.

See also

- Perovskite solar cell

- CIGS solar cell

- Organic solar cell

References

Solar cells